This is a list of FM radio stations in the United States having call signs beginning with the letters WN through WP. Low-power FM radio stations, those with designations such as WNAP-LP, have not been included in this list.

WN

WO

WP

See also
 North American call sign

Lists of radio stations in the United States